The men's 800 metres event at the 2019 European Athletics U23 Championships was held in Gävle, Sweden, at Gavlehov Stadium Park on 12 and 14 July.

Medalists

Results

Heats
Qualification: First 3 in each heat (Q) and next 2 fastest (q) qualified for the final.

Final

References

800
800 metres at the European Athletics U23 Championships